Jesús Armando "El Woody" Sánchez (born March 7, 1984, in Mexico City) is a Mexican former footballer. He last played for Veracruz on loan from Club América.

Sánchez played in Club América since he was around the age of 10.

External links
 

1984 births
Living people
Liga MX players
Club América footballers
Footballers from Mexico City
Mexican footballers
Association football central defenders